State Route 341 (SR 341) is a  state highway that travels within portions of Hamblen and Jefferson counties in the eastern portion of the U.S. state of Tennessee. It connects Talbott with White Pine.

Route description
SR 341 begins at an intersection with US 11E in Talbott (within the city limits of Morristown, Tennessee) in Hamblen County. It then enters Jefferson County and heads south as Talbott–Kansas Road to an intersection where Talbott–Kansas Road travels south and SR 341 turns east onto North White Pine Road and continues as White Pine Road until its intersection with SR 66. It enters White Pine just before the SR 66 intersection, where it becomes Roy Messer Highway and then has an interchange with I-81 and continues east to meet its eastern terminus, an intersection with US 25E.

Junction list

See also

References

341
Transportation in Hamblen County, Tennessee
Transportation in Jefferson County, Tennessee
Morristown, Tennessee